Pugazhendhi, commonly known as Pugazh, is an Indian actor and comedian. He rose to fame after appearing on Star Vijay's Cooku with Comali.

Personal life 
Pugazh was born on 14 November 1990 in Cuddalore. He was educated at St. Joseph's High School and Sri Padaleswarar Secondary School in Thirupapuliyur. Pugazh married Benzi Riya in 2022.

Career 
Pugazh grew to prominence after competing in Cooku with Comali. He is known for his mimicry and humour. Udhaya Raj of Baana Kaathadi fame helped Pugazh audition for Kalakka Povathu Yaaru, but was not cast. Undeterred, he worked as a computer serviceman at Vijay TV and later starred in Sirippu Da alongside Dheena. Following his later selection and success in Kalakka Povathu Yaaru, he was given the opportunity to participate in Cooku with Comali. He garnered success on the show resulting in several offers to act in Tamil films. He debuted in Sixer and has since starred in more movies like Cocktail, Sabhaapathy, and Etharkkum Thunindhavan.

Filmography

Films

Television

Music videos

Accolades

References

External links 
 
 

1990 births
21st-century Indian male actors
Indian male comedians
Indian male film actors
Living people
Male actors in Tamil cinema
Tamil comedians
Television personalities from Tamil Nadu